Abysmal Evenings is the ninth album by composer Paul Schütze, released in 1996 through Virgin Records.

Track listing

Personnel 
Denis Blackham – mastering
Anne-Louise Falsone – design
Robert Hampson – guitar
Andrew Hulme – engineering
Ben Neill – trumpet
Paul Schütze – instruments, production, design

References 

1996 albums
Paul Schütze albums
Virgin Records albums
Albums produced by Paul Schütze